Mesnils-sur-Iton (literally Mesnils on Iton) is a commune in the department of Eure, northern France. The municipality was established on 1 January 2016 by merger of the former communes of Condé-sur-Iton, Damville (the seat), Gouville, Manthelon, Le Roncenay-Authenay and Le Sacq. On 1 January 2019, the former communes Buis-sur-Damville, Grandvilliers and Roman were merged into Mesnils-sur-Iton.

Population

See also 
Communes of the Eure department

References 

Communes of Eure
Populated places established in 2016
2016 establishments in France